Mette Melgaard (born 3 June 1980 in Syddjurs) is a Danish handball coach and former player. She is currently the assistant coach for Team Esbjerg in the Danish Damehåndboldligaen.

At the 2010 European Women's Handball Championship she reached the bronze final and placed fourth with the Danish team.

Achievements

Club
 Damehåndboldligaen:
Winner: 2003, 2005, 2007, 2012 
Silver Medalist: 2011
Bronze Medalist: 2009, 2010
Landspokalturneringen:
Winner: 2002, 2009
EHF Champions League:
Winner: 2004, 2005, 2007
EHF Cup:
Winner: 2003
EHF Cup Winners' Cup:
Winner: 2009

Individual
 2002: Landspokalturneringen's Most Valuable Player
 2006-2007: Damehåndboldligaen's All-Star Team

References

External links
 Profile on Randers HK official website

1980 births
Living people
Danish female handball players
Handball players at the 2012 Summer Olympics
Olympic handball players of Denmark
People from Syddjurs Municipality
Sportspeople from the Central Denmark Region